John Overton (April 9, 1766 – April 12, 1833) was an American planter, advisor of Andrew Jackson, a judge at the Tennessee Supreme Court, a banker and political leader.

Early life and education
Overton was born on April 9, 1766, in Louisa County, Virginia. His parents were James Overton and Mary Waller; his father was a great-grandson of Robert Overton, the Parliamentarian military commander during the English Civil War (and friend of Marvell and Milton).

Career
In 1787, he began his law career and moved to Nashville, Tennessee in 1789, to practice law at the Davidson County court. He was elected to succeed his friend Andrew Jackson as a member of the Tennessee Supreme Court in 1804, where he served as a judge until 1810. His elder brother Thomas Overton served as Jackson's second in his duel with Charles Dickinson. In 1819, he founded Memphis, Tennessee on land he owned with Andrew Jackson and James Winchester.

He was elected a member of the American Antiquarian Society in 1820.

Overton engaged in the slave trade and became one of the wealthiest men in Tennessee. Emily Berry was sold by Overton in Memphis.  Her children Mary, Martha, Billy and Minerva were looking for her years later.

Personal life
He was married to Mary McConnell White, the daughter of Knoxville founder, James White. He built Greenlevel in Collierville, Tennessee, although he continued to live at Travellers Rest in Nashville.

Later life and death
He died April 12, 1833, at Travellers Rest, his Nashville home.

Legacy
The nearby John Overton Comprehensive High School, located just across the railroad tracks that abut the property, is named in his honor.

Overton Park in midtown of Memphis was named after John Overton.

The Overton Lodge of Free and Accepted Masons on the historic courthouse square in Rogersville, Tennessee was named after John Overton and is the oldest continuously operating Masonic lodge in the state of Tennessee, and has been operating from the same building since circa 1840, and is a contributing property to the Rogersville Historic District.

Living direct descendants include the Overton family in Nashville, who live very close to Travelers Rest. Perkins Baxter Overton grew up playing on the Travelers Rest grounds and is the great-great-great-grandson of Judge John. His son Thomas Perkins Overton also has a son named John Overton.

Overton descendant as well, was American geologist William R. Dickinson.

References

External links
 
John Overton Papers, 1797-1833, Tennessee State Library and Archives.
Claybrooke and Overton Papers, 1747-1894, Tennessee State Library and Archives.
Murdock Collection of John Overton Papers, 1780-1908, Tennessee State Library and Archives.

1766 births
1833 deaths
People from Louisa County, Virginia
American people of English descent
Politicians from Nashville, Tennessee
American planters
American slave owners
American slave traders
Members of the American Antiquarian Society
Virginia colonial people
Justices of the Tennessee Supreme Court
Burials at Mount Olivet Cemetery (Nashville)